The Datsun Roadster was a lightweight automobile produced by Nissan in the 1930s. The series was a predecessor to the Fairlady sports cars, and was an example of the earliest passenger cars produced in Japan. It shows some similarities to the Kurogane Type 95 four-wheel-drive roadster used by the Japanese Army during World War II.

Roadster
The first car to bear the Datsun name was the 1932 Type 11 Roadster. It was powered by a 495 cc straight-4 10 hp (7.5 kW) engine. The 1931 Type 11 had the same engine and was called a "Datson".

Road Star
The Roadster was replaced for 1935 by the Road Star. It used a 14 hp (10.4 kW) 722 cc engine, and a Coupe model was also available. The engine's output was pushed to 16 hp (12 kW) for 1937. Production ended with Japan's entry into World War II in 1941.

See also
Kurogane Type 95

References
Datsun Roadster parts available at www.datsunroadster.com (Rallye Enterprises, Ltd.)
Datsun Roadster parts available at www.datsunparts.com
 
 

Roadster
Cars introduced in 1932
1940s cars